"Fake Tales of San Francisco" is a song by English indie rock band Arctic Monkeys originally released on the band's first EP, Five Minutes with Arctic Monkeys, in May 2005. After being featured on the band's debut album Whatever People Say I Am, That's What I'm Not, the song was released as a radio-only single in the United States instead of "Leave Before the Lights Come On", which was released there at the end of October. The song was also released in the Netherlands, where it reached number 31 on the Dutch Singles Chart.

Background 
The lyrical meaning of "Fake Tales of San Francisco" narrates the beginning of the band, their gigs in Sheffield local bars and their comparison to other bands. Alex Turner's lyrics express how bands tried to be like other bands, hence the lyric "get off the bandwagon". The lyrics expressed how bands portrayed this "fake" image of who they were and what they wanted their audience to perceive them as. In Fake Tales of San Francisco Alex's lyrics sound much older than an 18-year-old, the lyrics display a much wiser and sadder tone. There is a dry sorrow feel to the lyrics, especially when love is compared to be blind and deaf as well. Turner revamps a known phrase and gives it a new meaning. The lyrics also portray that a band should reconnect to its roots and should not create a fake idea of what the band is made to be.

Beneath the Boardwalk was an album with unofficial demos that started of the Arctic Monkeys. Listening to the demo of "Fake Tales of San Francisco" validates the beginning of the band, it demonstrates the guitars not directly on time and Alex's voice is not as developed as his most recent work. With the demo sounding raw there is appreciation for the natural untouched beauty of the single. Arctic Monkeys played covers of the White Stripes and the Strokes in their earlier gigs prior to reaching fame.

Music video 
The music video for the song is the same as when it was previously released on Five Minutes with Arctic Monkeys. Directed by a friend of the band, Mark Bull, the video features a compilation of footage of some of the band's earliest performances at various gigs and was given airplay in the UK on MTV Two in 2005. Although he has now left the band, the video includes several shots of former bassist Andy Nicholson. The music video was directed and released by Domino Recording Co. In the video it demonstrates the Arctic Monkeys at the start of their career. The video displays some flashback to old gigs. It shows the band in local smaller bars corresponding to the lyrics of the song. The video gives a good interpretation of the song as well, showing the band to be true to itself.

Charts

Certifications

References

External links 
 Fake Tales of San Francisco Lyrics

2005 songs
2006 singles
Arctic Monkeys songs
Songs about San Francisco
Songs written by Alex Turner (musician)
Song recordings produced by Jim Abbiss
Domino Recording Company singles